The Weatherill Ministry was the 72nd Ministry of the Government of South Australia, led by Jay Weatherill of the South Australian Branch of the Australian Labor Party. It commenced on 21 October 2011, when Weatherill succeeded Mike Rann as Premier and Labor leader.

First formation

Second formation

Weatherill made a major reshuffle of the ministry on 21 January 2013, following the resignations of a number of ministers.

Third formation

Weatherill reshuffled cabinet on 26 March 2014, following the government's re-election as a minority government at the 2014 state election. Independent Geoff Brock was appointed to the cabinet in exchange for his support on confidence and supply.

It was followed by two minor changes: the appointment of former Liberal leader turned independent Martin Hamilton-Smith on 27 May 2014, and the resignation of Jennifer Rankine and her replacement by Kyam Maher on 3 February 2015.

^Non-Labor MHAs Hamilton-Smith and Brock joined the Labor minority government cabinet following the 2014 election. Though later that year when it became a majority government following the 2014 Fisher by-election, Hamilton-Smith and Brock were kept in cabinet.

Fourth formation
Tony Piccolo announced his resignation from cabinet on 12 January 2016, citing cabinet renewal, ahead of an imminent cabinet reshuffle. Gail Gago announced her resignation from cabinet three days later, also citing cabinet renewal.

Peter Malinauskas and Leesa Vlahos were announced as the new cabinet members on 18 January. Swearing in and portfolio allocations occurred on 19 February.

Fifth formation
Jack Snelling announced his resignation as Minister for Health, Minister for the Arts & Minister for Health Industries on 17 September 2017, citing his desire to spend more time with family after 20 years in public life. He also announced that he would not be seeking election for the seat of Florey in 2018, after an ugly pre-selection fight with sitting member Frances Bedford. Leesa Vlahos announced her resignation as Minister for Mental Health one day later, citing her own health issues. Both ministers had been under intense scrutiny for their handling of their respective portfolios, with the Transforming Health program widely criticized, and the state's mental health facilities plagued with problems.

Chris Picton and Katrine Hildyard were announced as the new cabinet members on 18 September. Peter Malinauskas moved from his former portfolios of Police and Emergency Services, into a "super-health' portfolio as Minister for Health, and Minister for Mental Health.

Weatherill announced in 2018 a state Royal Commission into the Murray-Darling Basin Plan to investigate claims of "water theft" by upstream states after the Federal Government would not hold an inquiry, but (2019) the Commission has not reported, and an extension was refused by the new Marshall Ministry.

See also
Cabinet of South Australia

Notes
 Geoff Brock and Martin Hamilton-Smith continued to sit as independent MHAs while serving in a Labor ministry.

References

Australian Labor Party ministries in South Australia
South Australian ministries
2011 establishments in Australia
2018 disestablishments in Australia
Ministries established in 2011
Ministries disestablished in 2018